Timber Lake is a common name for lakes in the United States and may refer to:

reservoirs

See also 

 Timber Lake (disambiguation)
 Timberlake (disambiguation)

Timber